George Knapp is the name of:

 Georg Christian Knapp (1753–1825), German Protestant theologian
Georg Friedrich Knapp (1842–1926), German economist
George Owen Knapp (1855–1945), American industrialist
George Knapp (television journalist) (born 1952), American journalist
George Knapp (MP) (1754–1809), British Member of Parliament for Abingdon, banker and grocer